Lymphadenectomy or lymph node dissection is the surgical removal of one or more groups of lymph nodes. It is almost always performed as part of the surgical management of cancer. In a regional lymph node dissection, some of the lymph nodes in the tumor area are removed; in a radical lymph node dissection, most or all of the lymph nodes in the tumor area are removed.

Indications
It is usually done because many types of cancer have a marked tendency to produce lymph node metastasis early in their natural history. This is particularly true of melanoma, head and neck cancer, differentiated thyroid cancer, breast cancer, lung cancer, gastric cancer and colorectal cancer. Famed British surgeon Berkeley Moynihan once remarked that "the surgery of cancer is not the surgery of organs; it is the surgery of the lymphatic system".

The better-known examples of lymphadenectomy are axillary lymph node dissection for breast cancer; radical neck dissection for head and neck cancer and thyroid cancer; D2 lymphadenectomy for gastric cancer; and total mesorectal excision for rectal cancer.

With sentinel node biopsy
For clinical stages I and II breast cancer, axillary lymph node dissection should only be performed  after first attempting sentinel node biopsy. Sentinel node biopsy can establish cancer staging of the axilla if there are positive lymph nodes present. It also is less risky than performing lymphadenectomy, having fewer side effects and a much lower chance of causing lymphedema. If cancer is not present in sentinel lymph nodes then the axillary lymph node dissection should not be performed.

If one or two sentinel nodes have cancer which is not extensive, then no axillary dissection should be performed but the person with cancer should have breast-conserving surgery and chemotherapy appropriate for their stage of cancer.

With sentinel lymph node mapping
The concept of sentinel lymph node mapping was popularized by Donald Morton and others. Cancer with various primary sites (breast, melanoma, colorectal, etc.) often metastasize early to the first drainage lymphatic basin. This process is predictable anatomically according to the primary site in the organ and the lymphatic channels.  The first nodes (sentinel nodes) can be identified by particulate markers such as lymphazurin, methylene blue, India ink and radio-labelled colloid protein particles injected near the tumor site.  The draining sentinel node can then be found by the surgeon and excised for verification by the pathologist if tumor cells are present, and often these tumor cells are few and only easily recognized by careful examination or by using techniques such as special stains, i.e. immunohistochemical.  When the sentinel node is free of tumor cells, this is highly predictive of freedom from metastasis in the entire lymphatic basin, thus allowing a full node dissection to be avoided.

The practice of sentinel lymph node mapping has changed the surgical approach in many cancer systems, sparing a formal lymph node dissection for patients with sentinel lymph node negative for tumor and directing a full node dissection for patients with sentinel lymph node positive for tumor metastases.  For example, in stage II breast carcinoma, using the sentinel lymph node technique, 65% of patients could be spared from a formal node dissection.

Complications
Lymphedema may result from lymphadenectomy. Extensive resection of lymphatic tissue can lead to the formation of a lymphocele.

It is uncertain whether inserting wound drainage after groin lymph nodes dissection can reduce complications such as seroma, haematoma, wound dehiscence, and wound infection.

See also 
 List of surgeries by type

References

External links
 Axillary Lymph Node Dissection - online learning resource

Surgical oncology
Lymphatic organ surgery